Francesco Monaco (born 6 May 1960) is an Italian association football manager and a former player.

Career

Player 
Monaco has been a former player in the lower ranks of Italian professional football of Squinzano, Sampdoria, Novara, Teramo, Lucchese, Lanciano and Forlì.

Coach 
Monaco successively entered into a coaching career, serving as assistant coach of Lucchese during the 2000–01 season and then as Ascoli's youth coach until 2005. In July 2005 he took his first head coaching job at Serie C1's Lanciano, then working as head coach of A.C. Ancona from July to December 2006, and again from March 2007 to May 2009, leading the biancorossi to promotion to Serie B in 2008, before being sacked due to poor results in May 2009. His successive coaching experience was at the helm of Potenza on Prima Divisione, where he replaced Ezio Capuano for a bare month (from September to October 2009).

In July 2010 he was appointed new head coach of Lega Pro Seconda Divisione club Carrarese.

In summer 2011 he was appointed new head coach of Lega Pro Prima Divisione club Piacenza until the end of the season.

On 16 October 2012, he was named new coach of Foligno in Lega Pro Seconda Divisione.

On 16 June 2014, he was renamed new coach of Piacenza in Serie D.

In January 2018, he was hired by ASD Fabriano Cerret.

On 30 July 2019, he signed with Lucchese in Serie D. Lucchese was promoted to Serie C after the 2019–20 season. On 23 October 2020, he was dismissed by the club after the team only gained 1 point in the first 6 games of the Serie C season.

References

1960 births
Living people
Sportspeople from the Province of Brindisi
Association football midfielders
Italian footballers
Serie B players
Serie C players
U.C. Sampdoria players
Novara F.C. players
S.S. Teramo Calcio players
S.S.D. Lucchese 1905 players
S.S. Virtus Lanciano 1924 players
Forlì F.C. players
Italian football managers
A.C. Ancona managers
Potenza S.C. managers
Piacenza Calcio 1919 managers
Serie B managers
Serie C managers
Serie D managers
Footballers from Apulia